The American Newspaper Repository is a charity whose purpose is to collect and preserve original copies of American newspapers. It was founded in 1999 by the author Nicholson Baker when he learnt that the British Library was disposing of its collection of historic American newspapers. He cashed in his retirement fund to successfully bid for the collection at auction. With support from the Knight Foundation and MacArthur Foundation, the repository was established in an old mill building in Rollinsford, New Hampshire.  While serving as a director, Baker researched and wrote Double Fold: Libraries and the Assault on Paper about the way in which other library institutions were destroying rather than preserving such originals.

The collection was transferred to the care of the David M. Rubenstein Rare Book & Manuscript Library, part of the Duke University Libraries in 2004.

Contents

The contents include runs of over a hundred different periodicals from between 1852 and 2004 including:

 Barron's Magazine 1926–1946 
 Chicago Tribune 1888–1958 
 New Republic 1913–1984 
 New York Tribune and New York Herald Tribune 1866–1966 
 The New York Times 1915–1958
 New York World 1898-1930 
 Saturday Review 1924–1972

In total, there are about six thousand bound volumes and eleven thousand individual and bundled items. These include first printings of work by numerous famous authors such as H. L. Mencken, Mark Twain, Dorothy Parker, Robert Frost and Rudyard Kipling. The collection is an excellent archive of high quality rotogravure photographs which appeared in these periodicals. Other unusual formats include the first crosswords, needlepoint patterns, sheet music and full color reproductions of paintings of the period.

References

External links
 Original official homepage

1999 establishments in the United States
Archives in the United States
Duke University Libraries
Libraries in Strafford County, New Hampshire
Rollinsford, New Hampshire
Special collections libraries in the United States

History of newspapers